The Tekeli Mehmet Paşa Mosque is a mosque in the city of Antalya, Turkey. The mosque takes its name from Lala Mehmed Pasa.

Architecture
Built in the 17th century in the Kalekapisi district, the mosque is one of the most important Ottoman mosques in the city. The main dome, which rises on a high rim, is supported by three semi domes, one each in the east, west, and south, as well as three domes on the northern side. There are tiled panels decorated with Koranic verses in taliq script on the pointed arch-formed lunettes of the windows on the northern façade of the mosque and inside it.

References

External links
 A picture of the mosque

Ottoman mosques in Antalya
Mosques in Antalya
Tourist attractions in Antalya
18th-century mosques
Mosque buildings with domes